Meaux-la-Montagne is a commune in the Rhône department in eastern France.

See also
 Official website of Meaux-la-Montagne.
Communes of the Rhône department

References

Communes of Rhône (department)
Beaujolais (province)